State Property is the soundtrack to the 2002 film, State Property, as well as the debut album by the rap group, State Property. Selling 51,500 copies in its first week, the album was a success, making it to 14 on the Billboard 200, 1 on the Top R&B/Hip-Hop Albums and 2 on the Top Soundtracks, and spawned one single "Roc the Mic", which was a minor hit, making it to 55 on the Billboard Hot 100. The remix to "Roc The Mic" features St. Louis rappers Nelly & Murphy Lee of the St. Lunatics and was included on rapper Nelly's  2002 album, "Nellyville" as a radio-only single.

Track listing

Charts

Weekly charts

Year-end charts

References

2002 debut albums
2002 soundtrack albums
State Property (band) albums
Albums produced by Just Blaze
Albums produced by Kanye West
Crime film soundtracks
Hip hop soundtracks
Def Jam Recordings soundtracks
Roc-A-Fella Records soundtracks
Gangsta rap soundtracks
Def Jam Recordings albums
Roc-A-Fella Records albums